Seza Kutlar Aksoy (born 1945, Gaziantep) is a Turkish children's author residing in Istanbul, Turkey. She is the younger sister of writer Onat Kutlar.

Biography
Seza Kutlar Aksoy was born in Gaziantep, Turkey.

She is a member of the Turkish section of the International P.E.N., TYS (Turkish Writers' Union), and a member of the administrative board of the Turkish Association of Children and Youth Publications. She is nominated as the 2011 Turkey candidate for the Astrid Lindgren Memorial Award, the world's largest children's and youth literature award, and the second largest literature prize in the world..

Seza Kutlar Aksoy's stories have been published in children's literature magazines including Redmouse and Milliyet Kids. Her radio play, Adventures of Memo was broadcast by the Voice of Turkey (Foreign Broadcast of Turkish Radio and Television). One of her stories, Bluebird, was adapted and staged by Tiyatroom Group. Aksoy conducts regular literary sessions with children in schools on reading stories, dramatization and thinking about stories, students' own life or about life itself.

Bibliography

Pre-school

Nil soru soruyor (Nellie Poses Questions)
Uyku agaci (The Slumber Tree)

School-age
Büyülü Bahçe (Enchanted Garden) (Stories)
Küçük Prenses ve Kardelen (Little Princess and the Snowdrop) (Stories), Tudem
Tomurcuk ve Pembe Kedi (Rosie and The Pink Cat), 
Tomurcuk ve Pembe Kedi Altın Peşinde (Rosie and the Pink Cat running after Gold), Tudem
Nun Gelince (When Nun Comes), TudemGüvercin’in Saati (The Watch of Guvercin)Şişko Patates (Fat Potato) Can yayinlariAkıllı Anka (Clever Phoenix) Güneşe Köprü (A Bridge to the Sun) (Stories)Seker Kiz ve Buyulu Elma Can yayinlari
 Cevrimicinde Serafettin Can yayinlari

YouthAsk Kalir (Love Remains)'' Published within the PEACH (Publications on Europe for Adults and Children Through History) project supported by the European Commission's, Horizons Program.

Awards
Aksoy won following prizes in children's literature:
Sıtkı Dost Awards (1991), mention.
Turkish Redmouse Awards, Grand Award (1992).
Tudem Awards, Grand Award (2007).
TMMOB Award (2009).
Nominated for the Astrid Lindgren Memorial Award by Turkey, 2011.

References

External links

Turkish children's writers
1945 births
Living people
People from Gaziantep
20th-century Turkish women writers
20th-century Turkish writers
21st-century Turkish women writers
Turkish women children's writers
Writers from Istanbul
Istanbul University alumni